Atypus piceus is a mygalomorph spider of the family Atypidae. It occurs in Europe to Moldavia, and Iran and is the type species of the genus Atypus.

Description
Males are of a deep black, while spiderlings and females are dark brown with a violet hue. The very long posterior spinnerets consist of three segments, the last segment features a light blot, which is helpful in identifying the species. A. piceus can live for more than 10 years.

Habits
The mating period is from June to July, when the males search for females. The spiderlings hatch during autumn and overwinter in the mother's burrow without feeding. After emerging in spring, they climb nearby plants and use strands of silk to fly away (ballooning).

Evolutionary relationship
Atypus piceus is possibly the result of hybridisation of A. affinis and A. muralis. A. muralis has posterior spinnerets with four segments, A. affinis with three, and A. piceus has three, but the white blot could be result of this hybridisation.

References

Atypidae
Spiders of Asia
Spiders of Europe
Moldavia
Fauna of Iran
Spiders described in 1776
Taxa named by Johann Heinrich Sulzer